April 28 - Eastern Orthodox liturgical calendar - April 30

All fixed commemorations below celebrated on May 12 by Orthodox Churches on the Old Calendar.

For April 29th, Orthodox Churches on the Old Calendar commemorate the Saints listed on April 16.

Saints

 Apostles Jason and Sosipater of the Seventy, and their companions, at Corfu (63): (see also April 28 - Slavic):
 Martyrs Saturninus, Jakischolus (Inischolus), Faustianus, Januarius, Marsalius, Euphrasius, Mammius - the holy seven former thieves;
 Virgin Martyr Cercyra.
 Martyrs Zeno, Eusebius, Neon, and Vitalis, who were converted by Apostles Jason and Sosipater (c. 63) (see also April 28 - Slavic)
 Martyrs Vitalius and his wife Valeria (62)
 Venerable Memnon the Wonderworker (2nd century) (see also April 28 - Greek)
 Martyrs Diodorus and Rhodopianus the Deacon, at Aphrodisia in Anatolia (284-305) (see also May 3 - Greek)
 Nine martyrs at Cyzicus (c. 286-299): (see also April 28 - Greek)
Theognes, Rufus, Antipater, Theostichus, Artemas, Magnus, Theodotus, Thaumasius, and Philemon.
 Saint Atticus and Cyntianus (Cyntion), martyrs.
 St. John Tolaius, Patriarch of Alexandria (482)
 Saint Nicetas, Abbot of Synnada (9th century)
 Saint Nicephorus of Sebaze (9th century)

Pre-Schism Western saints

 Martyr Torpes (Tropez), under Nero (65)
 Hieromartyrs Agapius and Secundinus, Bishops in Numidia (259)
 Saint Severus of Naples, Bishop of Naples and wonderworker (409)
 Saint Dictinus, the first convert of St. Patrick in Ulster in Ireland (5th century)
 Saint Paulinus of Brescia, Bishop and confessor (c. 545)
 Saint Secundellus the Deacon, in Gaul (6th century)
 Saint Endelienta, nun and recluse of Cornwall (6th century)
 Saint Senan of North Wales, hermit (7th century)
 Saint Fiachan of Lismore (Fiachina, Fianchne, Fianchine), a monk at Lismore and a disciple of St Carthage the Younger (7th century)
 Saint Wilfrid II, Bishop of York (744)
 Saint Ava of Dinant, a niece of King Pepin, and Abbess of a convent at Denain in Hainault (c. 845)
 Martyr Daniel of Gerona, born in Asia Minor, became a hermit, was martyred in Spain (9th century)

Post-Schism Orthodox saints

 Saint John Kaloktenes, Metropolitan of Thebes, the New Merciful (c. 1180)
 St. Arsenius, Archbishop of Suzdal (1627)
 Saint Basil of Ostrog, Wonderworker of Ostrog, myrhh-streamer, Metropolitan of Zahumlje (1671)
 Holy Martyrs of Lazeti, Georgia (17th-18th centuries)
 New Martyr Stanko the Shepherd, of Montenegro (1712)
 Venerable Nectarius of Optina, Elder, of Optina Monastery (1928)

New martyrs and confessors

 New Martyr Vasilije of Peć (17th century)

Other commemorations

 Repose of Hieromonk Eulogius of Valaam (1969)
 Glorification (2002) of St. Amphilochius the Wonderworker, Schema-abbot of Pochaev (1971)

Icon gallery

Notes

References

Sources
 April 29/May 12. Orthodox Calendar (Pravoslavie.ru).
 May 12 / April 29 (Church Calendar). Holy Trinity Russian Orthodox Church (A parish of the Patriarchate of Moscow).
 April 29. OCA - The Lives of the Saints.
 April 29. Latin Saints of the Orthodox Patriarchate of Rome.
 The Roman Martyrology. Transl. by the Archbishop of Baltimore. Last Edition, According to the Copy Printed at Rome in 1914. Revised Edition, with the Imprimatur of His Eminence Cardinal Gibbons. Baltimore: John Murphy Company, 1916. pp. 120–121.
 Rev. Richard Stanton. A Menology of England and Wales, or, Brief Memorials of the Ancient British and English Saints Arranged According to the Calendar, Together with the Martyrs of the 16th and 17th Centuries. London: Burns & Oates, 1892. pp. 185–186.
Greek Sources
 Great Synaxaristes:  29 Απριλίου. Μέγας Συναξαριστής.
  29 Απριλίου. Ecclesia.gr. (H Εκκλησία της Ελλάδος).
Russian Sources
  12 мая (29 апреля). Православная Энциклопедия под редакцией Патриарха Московского и всея Руси Кирилла (электронная версия). (Orthodox Encyclopedia - Pravenc.ru).
  29 апреля (ст.ст.) 12 мая 2013 (нов. ст.) . Русская Православная Церковь Отдел внешних церковных связей. (DECR).

April in the Eastern Orthodox calendar